11er Haus is a 2005 Austrian comedy mini documentary television series by Alfred Dorfer and Harald Sicheritz. Five episodes were produced by ORF, focusing on a Viennese tenement house and its inhabitants and is a microcosm for over five decades of political and economic changes in Austria between 1955 and 2005.

In 2021 the series began streaming on the online platform Flimmit.

Cast
 Julia Stemberger as Christl Steiner
 Johannes Silberschneider as Herr Fischer
 Wolfgang Böck as Karl Toperzer
 Erika Mottl as Mama Steiner
 Nicholas Ofczarek as Franz Moser
 Alexander Lutz as Lukas
 Marie-Christine Friedrich as Sabine
 Michael Pascher as Josef
 Matthias Franz Stein as Fritz
 Wolfram Berger as Gaskassier Lehner
 Gabriela Benesch as Hannelore Moser
 Bettina Redlich as Grete Toperzer
 Eva Billisich as Kathi Brenner
 Simon Schwarz as Rupert Quester
 Sabrina White as Isabella Quester
 Michael Ostrowski as Helmut
 Gertraud Jesserer as Emmi Horvath

Episodes
1: Manderlradio
2: Freie Liebe
3: Cordoba
4: Funkschatten
5: Abschlussfest

See also 
 List of Austrian television series

References

External links 
 

Austrian television series
ORF (broadcaster) original programming
2005 Austrian television series debuts
2005 Austrian television series endings
2000s Austrian television series
German-language television shows